Gabriel de Jesús Cárdenas Guízar (born 28 June 1987) is a Mexican politician affiliated with the PAN. He currently serves as Deputy of the LXII Legislature of the Mexican Congress representing Veracruz.

References

1987 births
Living people
Politicians from Veracruz
People from Tierra Blanca, Veracruz
National Action Party (Mexico) politicians
21st-century Mexican politicians
Deputies of the LXII Legislature of Mexico
Members of the Chamber of Deputies (Mexico) for Veracruz